Nationality words link to articles with information on the nation's poetry or literature (for instance, Irish or France).

Events
 Scriblerus Club begins meeting (stops meeting in 1745)

Works published
 Sir Richard Blackmore, Creation: a philosophical poem
 John Dennis, Essay on the Genius and Writings of Shakspear: with Some Letters of Criticism to the Spectator, a pamphlet of literary criticism, London
 William Diaper:
 Dryaides; or, The Nymphs Prophecy (published this year, although the book states "1713")
 Nereides; or, Sea-Eclogues
 Thomas Ellwood, Davideis: The Life of King David of Israel
 George Granville, Lord Lansdowne, Poems Upon Several Occasions
 Bernard Mandeville, published anonymously, Typhon; or, The Wars Between the Gods and Giants
 Peter Anthony Motteux, A Poem Upon Tea
 John Philips, Poems, published posthumously
 Alexander Pope, editor, Miscellaneous Poems and Translations (also known as Lintot's Miscellany), including a two-canto version of Pope's "The Rape of the Lock", published anonymously (poem enlarged in 1714)
 Matthew Prior, published anonymously, Erle Robert's Mice: A tale, in imitation of Chaucer
 Nicholas Rowe, translated from Claude Quillet, Callipaedia
 Shota Rustaveli, The Knight in the Panther's Skin first printed (originally written in the 12th century)
 George Sewell, The Patriot
 Thomas Tickell, A Poem, to his Excellency the Lord Privy-Seal, on the Prospect of Peace
 John Wright, The Best Mirth; or, The Melody of Sion, hymns

Births
Death years link to the corresponding "[year] in poetry" article:
 October 8 – Alison Cockburn, née Rutherford (died 1794), Scottish poet
 December 3 – Joseph Relph (died 1743), English poet from Cumberland
 Richard Glover (died 1785), English poet
 Bharatchandra Ray (died 1760), Bengali and Sanskrit poet and song composer
 Christian Reuter (died 1765), German poet
 Approximate date – Emanuel Collins, English clergyman and miscellaneous writer

Deaths
Birth years link to the corresponding "[year] in poetry" article:
 February 5 (bur.) – John Norris of Bemerton (born 1657), English theologian, philosopher and poet
 June 12 – Carlo Alessandro Guidi (born 1650), Italian poet 
 July 1 – William King (born 1663), English poet

See also

Poetry
List of years in poetry
List of years in literature
 18th century in poetry
 18th century in literature
 Augustan poetry

Notes

 "A Timeline of English Poetry" Web page of the Representative Poetry Online Web site, University of Toronto

18th-century poetry
Poetry